Ebrahim Salehi is an Iranian Football forward who plays for Persian Gulf Pro League club Pars Jonoubi.

Club career statistics

References

Living people
Iranian footballers
Pars Jonoubi Jam players
Association football forwards
1991 births
People from Bushehr